A. hystrix may refer to:
 Abacarus hystrix, the cereal rust mite or grain rust mite, a mite species
 Acromyrmex hystrix, an ant found in the New World

See also 
 Hystrix (disambiguation)